YTH domain family protein 3 is a protein that in humans is encoded by the YTHDF3 gene.

See also 
N6-Methyladenosine

References

Further reading